Haslegrave Ground is a cricket ground in Loughborough, Leicestershire.  The ground is based at Loughborough University. The first recorded match on the ground was in 1983, when Loughborough Students played Exeter University in the quarter finals of the University Athletics Union Championship.  The ground held two Women's One Day Internationals in 2008, when England women played West Indies women in both matches, and hosted a single first class match in 2011 between Loughborough MCCU and Northamptonshire.

References

External links
Haslegrave Ground on CricketArchive
Haslegrave Ground on Cricinfo

Cricket grounds in Leicestershire
Cricket at Loughborough University
Sports venues completed in 1988
University sports venues in the United Kingdom